The 1994 German Figure Skating Championships took place on December 17–18, 1993 in Herne. Skaters competed in the disciplines of men's singles, ladies' singles, pair skating, ice dancing, and precision skating on the senior and junior levels.

Results

Men

Ladies

Pairs

Ice dancing

Precision skating

External links
 1994 German Championships results

German Figure Skating Championships, 1994
German Figure Skating Championships